The Estadio Único Madre de Ciudades is a stadium located in the city of Santiago del Estero in the homonymous province of Argentina. The stadium was inaugurated on March 4, 2021, before the 2019 Supercopa Argentina match contested by River Plate and Racing Club. President of Argentina Alberto Fernández attended the ceremony.

The Estadio Único was expected to host some matches during the binational 2020 Copa América to be held in Argentina and Colombia. However, due to the COVID-19 pandemic, the tournament was re-scheduled to 2021 and eventually moved to Brazil. The stadium held its first international match on 3 June 2021, hosting the 2022 FIFA World Cup qualification match between Chile and Argentina.

The stadium, the largest venue in the province, is owned and administrated by the provincial government and has a seating capacity of over 30,000 spectators. The stadium facilities include a restaurant, a museum, a game room, and parking lots.

History

On 13 April 2018, Santiago del Estero's governor Gerardo Zamora, along with the Argentine Football Association (AFA)'s president Claudio Tapia, presented a new stadium project in the province, which was accepted. Both authorities signed an agreement for the stadium to host qualification matches for the Argentina national football team and to be nominated as one of the host stadiums during the 2021 Copa América, since Argentina and Colombia were organizing the event.

Another objective for the stadium is to be one of the potential hosts of the 2030 FIFA World Cup if the Southern Cone's bid is chosen as the winning venue to host it by FIFA.

Construction started in June 2018, and in July 2019, the Estadio Único was confirmed as one of the hosts of the 2021 Copa América. However, in November of that year, CONMEBOL questioned that nomination after seeing the low progresson construction. Finally, on December 3, 2019, the stadium was again confirmed to be one of the hosts of the final tournament.

After the draw, the stadium was scheduled to host two matches, between Uruguay and Paraguay and Chile national football team against Paraguay, on June 27. However, the immediate emergence of the COVID-19 pandemic worldwide disrupted the tournament's organization, so the cup was postponed to the next year. In May 2020, the stadium was chosen to host the Copa Sudamericana finals for three years, and in August, CONMEBOL gave the stadium a match between the Chile national football team and Paraguay on June 23, 2021.

Name
The stadium was named "Estadio Único Madre de Ciudades" (in English, Mother of Cities Stadium). This name was chosen as a tribute to Santiago del Estero, founded on 25 July 1553. As the oldest city of Argentina, it gained the nickname "Madre de Ciudades", which was used by the Spanish Empire before founding more cities across northern Argentina.

Features
In 2010, the architect and former president of Estudiantes de La Plata, Enrique Lombardi, named the project as the winner of a local competition. The stadium was built on a site located to the north of the city of Santiago del Estero on the banks of the Dulce River. The land is surrounded by Carretero Bridge and the city's botanical garden, and is connected to the Tren al Desarrollo by a station.

The project itself consists of a cylindrical stadium with fully covered grandstands, with a capacity of 29,000 seated spectators. It includes VIP sectors, restaurant spaces and a covered parking lot with a capacity for 400 cars. In addition, the stadium was designed with a main access plaza, a sports museum and a press area. The design complies with FIFA, CONMEBOL and AFA standards.

Sporting events

Football 
The first notable event held in the stadium was the 2019 Supercopa Argentina played by River Plate against Racing Club on 4 March 2021. The stadium was expected to host some matches of the 2021 Copa América, but the tournament was eventually moved to Brazil.

Rugby 
The stadium hosted t its first ever international rugby union match as Argentina hosted Scotland on Saturday 16 July in the third test match of a three test series between the two sides during the 2022 July rugby union tests.

Notes

Controversy 
The construction of the stadium received criticism by some parts of the press for being carried out in the midst of the economic crisis that plagued the country, the government's struggle to restructure Argentina's debt. The stadium was also criticized for being considered a priority of the provincial government, ahead of the existing poverty situation in the province of Santiago del Estero (about 70%). According to the INDEC, Santiago del Estero ranks first in the provinces in a critical state of unemployment throughout Argentina and ranks relatively low compared to other provinces on the Human Development Index.

The provincial governor, Gerardo Zamora, defended the construction of the stadium by arguing it helped promote Santiago del Estero as a "headquarters for international football" and a "tourism hotspot", as well as by citing the direct and indirect creation of jobs in its construction process.

See also
 List of football stadiums in Argentina

References

External links

 

Madre de Ciudades
Madre de Ciudades
Buildings and structures in Santiago del Estero Province
Sport in Santiago del Estero Province
Sports venues completed in 2020